Wrestling Titans, also known as Fighting Giants and Giants' Gate, is a pair of outdoor sculptures leading to the first courtyard of Prague Castle, in the Czech Republic.

References

External links

 

Outdoor sculptures in Prague
Prague Castle
Statues in Prague